Carrot cake (also known as passion cake) is cake that contains carrots mixed into the batter.

History 
The origins of carrot cake are disputed. Published in 1591, there is an English recipe for "pudding in a Carret root" that is essentially a stuffed carrot with meat, but it includes many elements common to the modern dessert: shortening, cream, eggs, raisins, sweetener (dates and sugar), spices (clove and mace), scraped carrot, and breadcrumbs (in place of flour).  Many food historians believe carrot cake originated from such carrot puddings eaten by Europeans in the Middle Ages, when sugar and sweeteners were expensive and many people used carrots as a substitute for sugar. 

Variations of the carrot pudding evolved to include baking with a crust (as pumpkin pie), steamed with a sauce, or molded in pans (as plum pudding) with icing.

In 1824, Beauvilliers had published in London an English version of his cookbook which includes a recipe for "Carrot Cakes" in a literal translation of his earlier recipe.

Another 19th-century recipe comes from the housekeeping school of Kaiseraugst (Canton of Aargau, Switzerland). According to the Culinary Heritage of Switzerland, it is one of the most popular cakes in Switzerland, especially for the birthdays of children.

The popularity of carrot cake was revived in the United Kingdom because of the rationing during the Second World War and also because of the promotion of carrots' consumption operated by the government.

Regional variations

UK and US 
Modern UK and US recipes typically feature a white cream cheese frosting. Sometimes nuts such as walnuts or pecans are added into the cake batter, as well as spices such as cinnamon, ginger and ground mixed spice. Toasting pecans and using brown sugar can add extra flavor and moisture. Fruit including pineapple, raisins and shredded coconut can also be used to add sweetness.

Switzerland 

Swiss  features almonds and hazelnuts and is often covered in glacé icing containing kirsch and topped with decorative carrots made from marzipan.

See also
 Carrot bread
 Carrot cake cookie
 List of carrot dishes

References

Bibliography 
 Alton Brown, I'm Just Here for More Food: Food × Mixing + Heat = Baking, New York: Stewart, Tabori & Chang, 2002.
 Alan Davidson, Oxford Companion to Food, second edition, illustrations by Soun Vannithone, London: Oxford University Press, 2006.

External links 
 Dessert in the Land of Plenty: A History of Carrot Cake in America (Guernica Magazine)

British cakes
French cakes
Carrot dishes
Culinary Heritage of Switzerland
English cuisine
French cuisine
Swiss cuisine